— words chiselled onto the tombstone of John Keats, at his request

Nationality words link to articles with information on the nation's poetry or literature (for instance, Irish or France).

Events
 The Saturday Evening Post founded in Philadelphia
 Lord Byron writes Sardanapalus, The Two Foscari and Cain
 Percy Bysshe Shelley's Queen Mab: a philosophical poem (1813) is distributed by an unauthorized publisher in London leading to prosecution by the Society for the Prevention of Vice.
 At about this date Sunthorn Phu is imprisoned and begins his epic poem Phra Aphai Mani.

Works published in English

United Kingdom
 Edwin Atherstone, The Last Days of Herculaneum
 Joanna Baillie, Metrical Legends of Exalted Characters
 John Banim, The Celt's Paradise
 Thomas Lovell Beddoes, The Improvisatore, in Three Fyttes, with Other Poems
 Lord Byron:
 Marino Faliero, Doge of Venice; The Prophecy of Dante, Marino Faliero performed April 25
 Don Juan, cantos 3–5, published anonymously, see also Don Juan 1819, 1823, 1824
 Sardanapalus; The Two Foscari; Cain, verse drama
 The Vision of Judgment (spelling is correct)
 Heaven and Earth
 The Prophecy of Dante
 John Clare, The Village Minstrel, and Other Poems
 William Gifford, The Satires of Aulus Persius Flaccus, in Latin and English
 Felicia Dorothea Hemans, Dartmoor
 William Hone, The Political Showman — At Home!, illustrated by George Cruikshank; those lampooned include Wellington, Lord Liverpool, George IV, Lord Castlereagh and John Stoddart, editor of The Times
 Leigh Hunt, The Months
 Letitia Elizabeth Landon ("L.E.L."), The Fate of Adelaide, and Other Poems
 Robert Millhouse, Vicissitude, a poem in four books and other pieces
 Thomas Moore, Irish Melodies, the first authorized edition of the author's lyrics; 10 editions by 1832
 Hannah More, Bible Rhymes
 John Henry Newman and John William Bowden, St. Bartholomew's Eve, published anonymously
 John William Polidori (probable suicide August 24), The Fall of the Angels, published anonymously
 Bryan Waller Procter, writing under the pen name "Barry Cornwall", Mirandola: A tragedy, verse drama
 J. H. Reynolds, The Garden of Florence
 Percy Bysshe Shelley:
 Epipsychidion, published anonymously
 Adonais: An elegy on the death of John Keats
 A Defence of Poetry
 Horatio Smith, Amarynthus, the Nympholept, published anonymously
 Robert Southey, A Vision of Judgement, in which Southey criticizes Lord Byron and Percy Bysshe Shelley, labeling them members of what Southey calls the "Satanic School" of poetry; Byron later decides he likes the name, and responds with his own work, A Vision of Judgment (with slightly different spelling in the title)

United States
 Paul Allen, Noah, about the Bible story, but also discusses slavery and America's place in God's providence; revised by John Neal
 William Cullen Bryant, Poems, eight poems, including "The Ages", a poem in Spenserian stanzas on the history of mankind and expressing a positive outlook on the future, delivered at the Harvard commencement; also the last significant revision of "Thanatopsis"; the book, issued by Richard Henry Dana, Edward Channing and Willard Phillips, is a critical success which promotes Bryant's reputation, but it does not sell well
 James Gates Percival, Poems, including the first part of "Prometheus"

Works published in other languages
 Alexander Pushkin denies it but is widely thought to be the author this April of The Gabrieliad (Гавриилиада, Gavriiliada), Russian, a sexually explicit, blasphemous work
 Heinrich Heine, Gedichte, German, his first published collection
 Wilhelm Müller, German
Gedichte aus den hinterlassenen Papieren eines reisenden Waldhornisten ("Poems from the posthumous papers of a travelling horn-player"), begins publication
Lieder der Griechen ("Songs of the Greeks"), begins publication

Births
Death years link to the corresponding "[year] in poetry" article:
 February 4 - Frederick Goddard Tuckerman (died 1873), American sonneteer
 March 10 - Màiri Mhòr nan Òran (died 1898), Scottish Gaelic
 March 17 - Adelia Cleopatra Graves (died 1895), American poet, educator, author
 March 19 - Richard Francis Burton (died  1890), English geographer, explorer, translator, writer, soldier, orientalist, cartographer, ethnologist, spy, linguist, poet, fencer, Egyptologist and diplomat
 March 24 - Jeanette Threlfall (died 1880), English hymnwriter and author of religious poems
 March 25 - Isabella Banks, née Varley (died 1897), English
 April 9 - Charles Baudelaire (died 1867), French
 May 29 - Frederick Locker-Lampson (died 1895), English
 July 8 - Maria White Lowell (died 1853), American poet and abolitionist
 November 28 - Nikolai Alekseevich Nekrasov (died 1877), Russian
 December 1 - Jane C. Bonar (died 1884), Scottish hymnwriter

Deaths

Death years link to the corresponding "[year] in poetry" article:
 January 14 – Jens Zetlitz, Norwegian
 February 23 – John Keats, English, in Rome from tuberculosis. He was buried in the Protestant Cemetery, Rome. His last request was followed, and so he was buried under a tomb stone without his name appearing on it but instead the words "Here lies one whose name was writ in water."
 March 17 – Louis-Marcelin de Fontanes, French
 April 15 – Johann Christoph Schwab (born 1743), German
 May 11 – George Howe (born 1769), the first Australian editor, poet and early printer
 Also:
 Anne Hunter (born 1742), Scots poet and songwriter who wrote the lyrics to many of Haydn’s songs
 Lucy Terry (born circa 1730 in Africa) first known African American poet, author of "Bars Fight, August 28, 1746", a ballad first printed in 1855
 Sukey Vickery (born 1799), American novelist and poet (a woman)

See also

 19th century in literature
 19th century in poetry
 Golden Age of Russian Poetry (1800–1850)
 List of poets
 List of years in literature
 List of years in poetry
 Poetry
 Romantic poetry
 Weimar Classicism period in Germany, commonly considered to have begun in 1788 and to have ended either in 1805, with the death of Friedrich Schiller, or 1832, with the death of Goethe

Notes

Poetry

19th-century poetry